Hippodamia or Hippodameia may refer to:
 Hippodamia (mythology), various figures in Greek mythology
 Hippodamia (beetle), a genus of ladybirds
 Hippodamia (horse), a French-trained thoroughbred racehorse
 692 Hippodamia, an asteroid
 Hippodameia (Ἱπποδάμεια), an agora at Piraeus named after the builder Hippodamus of Miletus

See also